Mirosław Marian Chmara (born 9 May 1964, in Bydgoszcz) is a retired pole vaulter from Poland. His personal best jump of 5.90 metres was achieved in June 1988 in Villeneuve-d'Ascq, and was also a Polish record for 23 years. It was beaten by Paweł Wojciechowski who jumped 5.91 metres in August 2011 in Szczecin.

He is a cousin of a former decathlete, Sebastian Chmara.

Achievements

See also
Polish records in athletics

References

External links

1964 births
Living people
Polish male pole vaulters
Athletes (track and field) at the 1988 Summer Olympics
Olympic athletes of Poland
Sportspeople from Bydgoszcz
Zawisza Bydgoszcz athletes